Matt Jaffe is an American singer-songwriter, guitarist and founder of the band Matt Jaffe & The Distractions.

Biography

Jaffe learnt his first chords by watching David Byrne play in the Jonathan Demme /Talking Heads concert film, Stop Making Sense. Four years later, Jerry Harrison, keyboardist and guitarist for The Talking Heads, discovered Jaffe at an open-mic showcase.

Harrison offered to record some of Jaffe's music. Before entering his junior year in high school, Jaffe had recorded 50 acoustic demos in Harrison's studio in Sausalito, California. During their collaboration, Harrison became a friend and advisor.

In 2013, Jaffe entered Yale University, but left school a year and a half later to continue to pursue music. While touring to support the EP, the band has opened for Mavis Staples and The Damnwells. The band embarked on its first extensive U.S. tour in 2015, opening for Blues Traveler.

Discography
Blast Off (2015)

California's Burning (2017)

The Spirit Catches You (2018)

Undertoad (2021)

Kintsugi (2021)

White Roses in the Snow (2022)

References

External links
 Official website
 YouTube channel

Living people
American rock guitarists
American male guitarists
American male songwriters
American rock singers
Singers from California
Songwriters from California
People from Mill Valley, California
Guitarists from California
21st-century American singers
21st-century American guitarists
21st-century American male singers
Year of birth missing (living people)